Susan Charlotte Catherine, Lady Adolphus Vane-Tempest (7 April 1839 – 6 September 1875), born Lady Susan Pelham-Clinton, was a British noblewoman and one of the mistresses of King Edward VII of the United Kingdom when he was Prince of Wales. Lady Susan was a bridesmaid to Victoria, Princess Royal, and two years later became the wife of Lord Adolphus Vane-Tempest. She took the Prince as her lover in about 1864 following her husband's death, and allegedly gave birth to his illegitimate child in 1871.

Family 
Lady Susan was born on 7 April 1839, the only daughter of British politician Henry Pelham-Clinton, 5th Duke of Newcastle, and Lady Susan Hamilton (daughter of Alexander Hamilton, 10th Duke of Hamilton, and Susan Beckford). She had four brothers including Henry Pelham-Clinton, 6th Duke of Newcastle-under-Lyne, and Lord Arthur Clinton (who was involved in the 1870 Boulton and Park scandal).

Her childhood was blighted by her parents' divorce in 1850, following the scandal when her mother eloped with her lover, Lord Walpole, by whom she had an illegitimate son, Horatio. In 1860, her mother, a divorcee, would marry for a second time a Belgian, Jean Alexis Opdebeck.

On 25 January 1858, Lady Susan stood as one of the bridesmaids to Victoria, Princess Royal, at her wedding to Emperor Frederick III at St James's Palace. She was depicted in the John Phillip painting which commemorated the event.

Marriage 
Susan married Lord Adolphus Vane-Tempest (2 July 1825 – 11 June 1864) on 23 April 1860, several weeks after her twenty-first birthday. He held the rank of Lieutenant-Colonel in the Army and was allegedly an alcoholic as well as mentally unstable. Queen Victoria described him as having "a natural tendency to madness". He died just four years after their marriage, which had produced one son:

 Major Francis Adolphus Vane-Tempest (4 January 1863 – 10 December 1932), married Gertude Magdalen Elliot, by whom he had issue.

On at least one occasion, Susan and her infant son were both physically attacked by her unstable husband.

Prince of Wales 
Sometime after her husband's death which occurred on 11 June 1864, she became the mistress of the Prince of Wales, who would later succeed his mother, Queen Victoria to the British throne as King Edward VII. He had married his consort, Alexandra of Denmark, in 1863. According to author John Van der Kiste, Susan bore the Prince an illegitimate child in 1871. He cites in his book Edward VII's Children that one of Susan's confidantes wrote to Edward advising him that the "crisis was due within two or three months", which is presumably a reference to Susan's pregnancy. She allegedly gave birth to the Prince's child in Ramsgate at the end of 1871. Nothing, however, is known of the subsequent fate because when Susan died on 6 September 1875 at the age of 36, she took the secret with her to the grave.

During DNA searching for the Romanov Family, an Australian man discovered a connection to Susan and to Queen  Elizabeth II. This man, determined to be known as William Willesden was born in 1872 in London and was transferred to Australia with a large estate to be adopted by a lady named Sarah Gale and her husband, Mr. Willesden. Mr. Willesden’s two sisters were governesses to the royal family and his wife was a lady-in-waiting for Queen Alexandra. This child is presumed to be the illegitimate child from Susan’s relationship with Edward VII.

References 

Secondary sources
 Anne Isba, Gladstone and Women (2006)
 H C G Matthew, The Gladstone 1875-98, vol.2, (Oxford 1995)
 John Van der Kiste, Edward VII's Children, (Alan Sutton, 1989)

1839 births
1875 deaths
Susan
Daughters of British dukes
Mistresses of Edward VII
Susan
Women of the Victorian era